Jody C Baumgartner (born July 24, 1958) is the Thomas Harriot College of Arts and Sciences Distinguished Professor, in the Department of Political Science at East Carolina University. He received his Ph.D. in political science from Miami University in 1998, specializing in the study of political humor, the vice presidency and presidential campaigns and elections. He is probably best known for researching the effects of viewing political humor on people's political attitudes, such as The Daily Show and The Colbert Report. [4][5]. He has authored or edited ten books (individually or in collaboration with others), most recently, the encyclopedia of "American of Political Humor," [1], and numerous journal articles (e.g., "The Fey Effect: Young Adults, Political Humor, and Perceptions of Sarah Palin in the 2008 Presidential Election Campaign,[2][3][4][5]) and book chapters.

Books 
2022. The Internet and the 2020 Presidential Campaign, Lexington (with Terri Towner, eds.).

2019. Conventional Wisdom and American Elections: Exploding Myths, Exploring Misconceptions. Fourth Edition. Lanham, MD: Rowman & Littlefield (with Peter L. Francia).

2019. "American Political Humor: Masters of Satire and Their Impact on U.S. Policy and Culture" (2 Volume Encyclopedia). ABC-CLIO. 

2018. Political Humor in a Changing Media Landscape: A New Generation of Research. Lexington (with Amy B. Becker, eds.).

2017. The Internet and the 2016 Presidential Campaign, Lexington (with Terri Towner, eds.).

2015. The Vice Presidency: From the Shadow to the Spotlight. Lanham, MD: Rowman & Littlefield. 

2014. Politics Is a Joke!: How TV Comedians Are Remaking Political Life. Boulder, CO: Westview (with S. Robert Lichter and Jonathan Morris). 

2008. Laughing Matters: Humor and American Politics in the Media Age. New York: Routledge (edited with Jonathan S. Morris). 

2006. The American Vice Presidency Reconsidered. Westport, CT: Praeger.

2003. Checking Executive Power: Presidential Impeachment in Comparative Perspective. Westport, CT: Praeger (edited with Naoko Kada).

2000. Modern Presidential Electioneering: An Organizational and Comparative Approach. Westport, CT: Praeger.

References 
 Baumgartner, Jody. 2019. "American Political Humor: Masters of Satire and Their Impact on U.S. Policy and Culture" (2 Volume Encyclopedia). ABC-CLIO. 
 Baumgartner, Jody. 2013. "No Laughing Matter? Young Adults and the 'Spillover Effect' of Candidate-centered Political Humor." HUMOR: International Journal of Humor Research. 26(1): 23-43. 
 Baumgartner, Jody. 2012. "The Fey Effect: Young Adults, Political Humor, and Perceptions of Sarah Palin in the 2008 Presidential Election Campaign." Public Opinion Quarterly. 76: 95-104 (with Jonathan S. Morris and Natasha L. Walth). 
 Baumgartner, Jody. 2008. "One 'Nation' Under Stephen? The Effects of the Colbert Report on American Youth." Journal of Broadcasting and Electronic Media. 52:622-43 (Jonathan S. Morris).
 Baumgartner, Jody. 2006. "The 'Daily Show Effect': Candidate Evaluations, Efficacy, and the American Youth." American Politics Research, 34:341-67 (with Jonathan S. Morris).

External links 
 
Faculty Page

1958 births
Living people
East Carolina University faculty
Miami University alumni